The Konawaruk River is a river in Potaro-Siparuni, Guyana.

About two miles from the juncture at the Essequibo, is Temple Bar falls.

Mining, especially for gold, was the primary industry along the river as early as 1900, and being mined by British Guiana Consolidated Enterprise Limited in the 1950s. In 2003, an assessment by United Development International "verified reserves of over 400,000 ounces of gold" in the claim encompassing the Konawaruk.

Pollution from extraction processes, including the use of missile dredges, has had a severe effect on the ecology of the river and environmentalists have considered it "dead" for its inability to support wildlife. Illegal dredging operations are a constant threat.

References 

Rivers of Guyana